Walter James Reeves (born December 15, 1965) is a former American football tight end, who played eight seasons in the National Football League (NFL). He played college football at Auburn University.

References

1965 births
Living people
American football tight ends
Auburn Tigers football players
Cleveland Browns players
Phoenix Cardinals players
San Diego Chargers players
People from Eufaula, Alabama
Players of American football from Alabama